Mishkan Museum of Art (Mishkan LeOmanut) is an Israeli art museum located on the grounds of Kibbutz Ein Harod Meuhad.

History
Mishkan LeOmanut was the first rural museum in Israel and the first museum run by a kibbutz. One of the kibbutz members, painter  , organized an "art corner" in his studio, a small wooden hut, in 1937. It developed into a museum specializing in the work of Jewish artists from the Diaspora and Jewish folk art. Today it is one of Israel's major art institutions.

An imposing museum building, designed by an architect , was inaugurated in 1948. Later the building became a source of inspiration for some of the 20th century's leading architects, among them Louis Kahn and Renzo Piano. 

During construction of the museum, the 1952  split of Ein Harod into  Ein Harod (Ihud) and Ein Harod (Meuhad) happened, but the museum was preserved as the joint institution for the split kibbutzim. The museum was declared as a "heritage site" by the Council for Conservation of Heritage Sites in Israel.

See also
List of Israeli museums
Israeli art

References

External links
Ein Harod museum
The Man with the Pumpkin Head, Exhibition at the Ein Harod Museum, Orna Bromberg, Moshe Mirski ,Keren Russo , May 2009

1937 establishments in Mandatory Palestine
Museums established in 1937
Art museums and galleries in Israel
Folk art museums and galleries